Crescent Machine Company was founded in Leetonia, Ohio in 1893.  It manufactured a line of industrial woodworking machinery, particularly band saws.  In 1940, it was bought by Pittsburgh Equitable Meter and Manufacturing Company, which became the Rockwell Manufacturing Company in 1946.

Third party website: http://wiki.vintagemachinery.org/CrescentHistory.ashx

Tool manufacturing companies of the United States
Companies based in Ohio

References

 A Short History of the Crescent Machine Company Part I: 1894 to 1920, The Chronicle, Vol. 60, No. 4. Dec. 2007. pp. 137-157.
 A Short History of the Crescent Machine Company Part II: 1921 to Present, The Chronicle, Vol. 61, No. 2. Jun. 2008. pp. 56-73.